Velázquez is a station on Line 4 of the Madrid Metro. It is located in fare Zone A.

History
The station opened to the public on 23 March 1944. It was built as part of the extension of Line 4 between Argüelles and Goya.

References 

Line 4 (Madrid Metro) stations
Railway stations in Spain opened in 1944